V. Krishnaprasad (19 September 1946 – 27 November 2015) was an Indian cricketer. He played one first-class match for Mysore in 1969/70.

See also
 List of Karnataka cricketers

References

External links
 

1946 births
2015 deaths
Indian cricketers
Karnataka cricketers
Place of birth missing
Cricketers from Bangalore